The Indian Navy Band, also known as Indian Naval Symphonic Band is the Indian Navy's full time music band. It was established in 1945 and is currently attached to the INS Kunjali. At the time of it commissioning, it had a strength of 50 musicians. All band members have a bachelor's degree from recognized university and can play competently in at least one military sponsored instrument.

Symphony Orchestra

The Indian Naval Symphonic Orchestra consists of 125 musicians, all of whom perform in concert settings. Various conductors of the band in its history have increased the range of its repertoire to include arrangements of symphonies, solos, concertos and other forms of contemporary music that includes Indian classical and Western pop music. The band has also improvised on Hindustani classical and Carnatic raga in various forms and genres, particularly in fusion with the Western and Jazz music. Today, the band now uses traditional instruments such as the Mridangam, the Tabla, and Carnatic instruments. The band also has made enhancements in recent years to include the addition adding a large string section comprising violins, violas, cellos and double basses to make it a complete symphonic orchestra.

Other ensembles

Parade Band
Corps of Drums
Jazz ensemble
Vocalist group

For the first time a combination with bagpipes instrument was played.

Events

General events
The band performs at events historically and logistically connected to the Indian Navy, including Fleet reviews and Presentation of Colours. It is an annual participant in the annual Delhi Republic Day parade on the Rajpath. Sub Lieutenant Ramesh Chand Katoch from the Navy Band has set a record for leading a band contingent on the Rajpath, leading it in 20 out 30 consecutive parades. It performs at State dinners held at the Rashtrapati Bhavan, hosted by the President of India for a foreign head of state. It also performs at community events in its vicinity.

Others
It has visited countries such as France, Italy, Germany, Malaysia, Singapore, China, South Africa and Eritrea. In 1971 and 1973, the band took part in the Ethiopian Navy Day celebrations. It also took part in the 1977 Royal Navy review in honor of the Silver Jubilee of Elizabeth II. It also took part in the Australian Bicentenary review in 1988 and the PLA Navy Platinum Jubilee Parade in 2018. The same band took part in the Royal Edinburgh Military Tattoo and the Spasskaya Tower Military Music Festival and Tattoo in 2017. In July 2009, bands from the three services, with the Navy band being one, marched down the Champs-Élysées in Paris with contingents from their respective services during the Bastille Day military parade to the sound of Indian martial tunes including Saare Jahan Se Achcha, Haste Lushai and Kadam Kadam Badaye Ja.

See also
Indian military bands
Military Music Wing
Band of the Brigade of Gurkhas
People's Liberation Army Navy Band

References

Military units and formations established in 1945
Indian Navy
Indian military bands
Musical groups established in 1945
1945 establishments in India